Maharaja Sir Mohammad Ali Mohammad Khan, Khan Bahadur, KCSI, KCIE (4 June 1878 – 23 March 1931) was the Raja of Mahmudabad from 28 June 1903 to 23 March 1931 and a noted politician, zamindar of British India.

Raja of Mahmudabad
He was son of Raja Sir Mohammad Amir Hasan Khan (1849–1903), the Jagirdar of Taluq of Mahmudabad. He was born at Mahmudabad in Sitapur district of Oudh, British India. 
After the death of his father in 1903, he became the Raja of Mahmudabad. The estate of Mahmudabad was among the largest estates in United Province. He was succeeded by his son Raja Mohammad Amir Ahmad Khan (1914-1973). The latter was succeeded by Raja Mohammad Amir Mohammad Khan former Member of the Legislative Assembly, (M.L.A.) of Uttar Pradesh.

Educationist and philanthropist

He played a key role to make Lucknow as the capital of United Province and foundation of Lucknow University and was the founder-member of University in 1920. The idea of starting a University at Lucknow was first mooted by him, who contributed an article to the columns of "The Pioneer" urging the foundation of a University at Lucknow. He and the Raja of Jahangirabad both donated one lakh rupees for the purpose of founding university in 1919 conference held by Sir Harcourt Butler, Governor of United Province, thus leading to foundation of University.

He was also appointed a trustee of Muhammadan Anglo-Oriental College in 1906 and had donated fifty thousand rupees for scientific educational development at Muhammadan Anglo-Oriental College of Aligarh. He was also actively involved in the campaign for a Muslim University. On 17 December, when Muhammadan Anglo-Oriental College became Aligarh Muslim University. The Governor General of India, Lord Chelmsford appointed him as its first Vice- Chancellor of Aligarh Muslim University with Begum of Bhopal and  Sir Agha Khan, who were respectively appointed as Chancellor and Pro-Chancellor of the Aligarh Muslim University. He immediately gave a generous donation of One Lakh rupees to College fund. He served as the Vice-Chancellor of Aligarh Muslim University from 17 December 1920 to 28 February 1923.
  
He fully financed the 1904 session of All India Muhammadan Educational Conference held in Lucknow under the chairmanship of Nawab Mohsinul Mulk. Further, he presided over the Muslim Educational Conference of  1909  held at Rangoon.

He also founded the Madrasatul Waizeen, a centre of Shia Islamic education in the city of Lucknow, in memory of his younger brother, Mohammad Ali Ahmad Khan in year 1919.

Politician and leader
Further, he served in various capacities as a Member of United Province Legislative Council from 1904–09; Member of Governor-General's Council 1907–20 and was elected a member of the Imperial Legislative Council
in 1908 and was a member for the years 1908–1912. In year 1927 he was elected unopposed as Member of Council of State. Further, he served as the Home Minister for the years 1920–26 and was the first Indian Member of The Administrative Council of Sir Spencer Harcourt Butler, Governor of United Province.

He was the President of the All-India Muslim League conferences held in the years 1917, 1918 and 1928 and as the President of British Indian Association (Oudh Taluqdars) for the years 1917–21 and 1930–31.

When the Indian National Congress leaders, including Motilal Nehru were jailed in Lucknow during Non Co-operation Movement, the Raja sahib helped in their release.

Honors and styles
He held the title of Khan Bhahadur and Maharaja Bahadur title was awarded to him as personal distinction. Further, he was created a  K.C.I.E.  in 1919 a C.S.I.  in 1921
and was promoted to style of K.C.S.I. in 1922

Poet
He was a poet and extensively wrote "Marsia" with pen name of "Mohib".

Death
He died in 1931 and was succeeded by his son, Mohammad Amir Ahmad Khan

References

1878 births
1931 deaths
All India Muslim League members
19th-century Indian royalty
Indian Shia Muslims
Knights Commander of the Order of the Indian Empire
Knights Commander of the Order of the Star of India
Indian knights
Indian philanthropists
19th-century Indian educational theorists
Members of the Imperial Legislative Council of India
Members of the Central Legislative Assembly of India
Urdu-language poets from India
Vice-Chancellors of the Aligarh Muslim University
People from Sitapur district
Founders of Indian schools and colleges
20th-century Indian educational theorists
20th-century Indian royalty
Members of the Council of State (India)